Leon Khachatourian is an Iranian Armenian boxer who became a member of Iran senior national Boxing team in 1957, and was also a member of Tehran Taj Club. He participated as a member of the Iranian boxers at the 1958 Asian Games, in the Middleweight division.
In Tokyo 1958, Khachatourian lost on points to Singh from India, in the semifinal, and won the bronze medal of the 75 kg boxing division. He retired from championship boxing and the Iranian national boxing team, after returning from the 1958 Asian Games.

References

Living people
1936 births
Iranian people of Armenian descent
Asian Games medalists in boxing
Boxers at the 1958 Asian Games
Asian Games bronze medalists for Iran
Iranian male boxers
Armenian male boxers

Medalists at the 1958 Asian Games
Middleweight boxers